Eric Béranger Dizan Bi Zamblé (born 20 December 1993) is a Ivorian professional footballer who plays as a forward for Ghanaian Premier league side Accra Hearts of Oak. He previously played for Stade d'Abidjan.

Club career

Ivory coast 
Dizan had spells with three clubs in his homeland Ivory Coast; RC Bettie, Ivoire Academie Abidjan and Stade d’Abijan before his arrival in Ghana to join the Accra-based club Hearts of Oak.

Hearts of Oak 
In April 2020, Dizan moved to Ghana and joined Accra Hearts of Oak as a free agent. He signed a three-year contract ahead of the 2020–21 Ghana Premier League season. In April 2020 his teammate Frederick Ansah Botchway revealed his admiration for him and stated he is the most skilful player at the club. He was named on the club's squad list for the season. He made his debut on 29 November 2020, coming on at half time for Abednego Tetteh in a 1–0 loss against International Allies.

International career 
Dizan has capped once at the senior level for the Ivory Coast national football team. He featured in a friendly match against Benin on 31 May 2017.

Honours 
Hearts of Oak

 Ghana Premier League: 2020–21

References

External links 
 

Living people
1993 births
Ivorian footballers
Association football forwards
Ghana Premier League players
Stade d'Abidjan players
Accra Hearts of Oak S.C. players
Ivory Coast international footballers
Ivorian expatriate footballers
Expatriate footballers in Ghana
Ivorian expatriate sportspeople in Ghana